Ryszard Borzuchowski (6 August 1910 – 7 July 1981) was a Polish rower. He competed in the men's coxless pair event at the 1936 Summer Olympics.

References

1910 births
1981 deaths
Polish male rowers
Olympic rowers of Poland
Rowers at the 1936 Summer Olympics
Rowers from Warsaw
People from Warsaw Governorate
Polish emigrants to Canada